Lewis Schaffer is an American comedian and broadcaster, based in Nunhead, south-east London, where he moved in 2000. 
He currently hosts his own weekly radio show on Resonance FM 104.4FM in London entitled "Nunhead American Radio with Lewis Schaffer". He appears regularly, as of 2023, as a pundit on GB News, and tours Britain as a stand-up comedian. He was the first comic to tour a "free admission" show across the United Kingdom and in 2015 performed at 47 theatres and art centres in Britain.

"Free until Famous"

Schaffer's show "Free until Famous" at the Source Below in Soho ran from October 2008 until April 2014, and afterwards at The Rancho Grill in Mayfair, London. His show was the "longest running solo stand-up show in London and perhaps all of Britain", running in excess of 400 performances.
He visited 47 British art centres and theatres in 2015 with a pay-what-you-want touring show. In December 2015, he performed a run of 12 dates at the Museum of Comedy under the show title "Lewis Schaffer: Free until Famous, £10".

"Lewis Schaffer: American in London"
Lewis Schaffer performed his show "Lewis Schaffer: American in London" every Sunday at the Leicester Square Theatre in London for over three years until June 2014, making it the longest solo comedy residency at the theatre.

Edinburgh Fringe stunt
In 2009, he announced as a publicity stunt that he would be sponsoring the Edinburgh Comedy Awards at the Edinburgh Festival Fringe. He claimed he had purchased the naming rights to the awards for "£99 with his mother as a judge". This was reported as fact in various publications and led to threat of a lawsuit from the award's rights holder and being fired by his theatrical agents.

Nunhead American Radio
Lewis Schaffer has hosted Nunhead American Radio with Lewis Schaffer on Resonance 104.4FM London since 2009. Now in its 11th year, is the only radio program for Americans living in Nunhead and is broadcast live every Monday at 6:30PM GMT. Guests have included comedians Russell Howard, Richard Herring, and Stewart Lee.

Awards
In 2009, he won the Malcolm Hardee Cunning Stunt Award for best publicity stunt at the Edinburgh Fringe and, in 2010, he was nominated for the Malcolm Hardee Award for Comic Originality.

In 2017, he won the Wee Review Fringe Experience Award for his Fringe show "Unopened Letters From My Mother", in which he opened and read a series of letters sent to him by his mother after he moved to London.

References

External links
 

Living people
1957 births
21st-century American comedians